Spider-Man is a superhero appearing in American comic books published by Marvel Comics. Created by writer-editor Stan Lee and artist Steve Ditko, he first appeared in the anthology comic book Amazing Fantasy #15 (August 1962) in the Silver Age of Comic Books. He has been featured in comic books, television shows, films, video games, novels, and plays. Spider-Man's secret identity is Peter Parker, a teenage high school student and an orphan raised by his Aunt May and Uncle Ben in New York City after his parents Richard and Mary Parker died in a plane crash. Lee and Ditko had the character deal with the struggles of adolescence and financial issues and gave him many supporting characters, such as Flash Thompson, J. Jonah Jameson, and Harry Osborn; romantic interests Gwen Stacy, Mary Jane Watson, and the Black Cat; and his enemies such as the Green Goblin, Doctor Octopus, and Venom. In his origin story, Spider-Man gets his superhuman spider-powers and abilities after being bitten by a radioactive spider; these include superhuman strength, speed, agility, jump, reflexes, stamina, durability, coordination and balance, clinging to surfaces and ceilings like a spider, and detecting danger with his precognition ability called "spider-sense." He also builds wrist-mounted "web-shooter" devices that shoot artificial spider-webs of his own design that were used for fighting his enemies and web-swinging across the city. Peter Parker originally used his powers for his own personal gain, but after his Uncle Ben was killed by a thief that Peter didn't stop, Peter begins to use his spider-powers to fight crime by becoming the superhero known as Spider-Man.

When Spider-Man first appeared in the early 1960s, teenagers in superhero comic books were usually relegated to the role of sidekick to the protagonist. The Spider-Man comic series broke ground by featuring Peter Parker, a high school student from Queens, New York, as Spider-Man's secret identity, whose "self-obsessions with rejection, inadequacy, and loneliness" were issues to which young readers could relate. While Spider-Man had all the makings of a sidekick, unlike previous teen heroes such as Bucky and Robin, Spider-Man had no superhero mentor like Captain America and Batman; he had learn the lesson for himself that "with great power comes great responsibility" — a line included in a text box in the final panel of the first Spider-Man's origin story but later retroactively attributed to his guardian, his late Uncle Ben Parker.

Marvel has featured Spider-Man in several comic book series, the first and longest-lasting of which is The Amazing Spider-Man. Over the years, the Peter Parker character developed from a shy, nerdy New York City high school student to a troubled but outgoing college student, to a married high school teacher to, in the late 2000s, a single freelance photographer. In the 2000s, he joins the Avengers. Doctor Octopus also took on the identity for a story arc spanning 2012–2014, following a body swap plot in which Peter appears to die. Marvel has also published comic books featuring alternate versions of Spider-Man, including Spider-Man 2099, which features the adventures of Miguel O'Hara, the Spider-Man of the future; Ultimate Spider-Man, which features the adventures of a teenaged Peter Parker in the alternate universe; and then Ultimate Comics: Spider-Man, which depicts the teenager named Miles Morales, who takes up the mantle of Spider-Man after Ultimate Peter Parker's apparent death. Miles later became a superhero in his own right and was brought into mainstream continuity, where he sometimes works alongside Peter.

Spider-Man is one of the most popular and commercially successful superheroes. He has appeared in countless forms of media, including several animated TV series including the first original animated series Spider-Man with Paul Soles voicing Spider-Man, a live-action television series, syndicated newspaper comic strips, and multiple series of films. Spider-Man was first portrayed in live-action by Danny Seagren in Spidey Super Stories, a The Electric Company skit from 1974 to 1977. In live-action films, Spider-Man has been portrayed by actors Tobey Maguire in Sam Raimi's Spider-Man trilogy, by Andrew Garfield in two films directed by Marc Webb, and in the Marvel Cinematic Universe by Tom Holland. Reeve Carney starred originally as Spider-Man in the 2010 Broadway musical Spider-Man: Turn Off the Dark. Spider-Man was also been voiced by Jake Johnson and Chris Pine in the animated film called Spider-Man: Into the Spider-Verse. Spider-Man has been well-received as a superhero and comic book character, and he is often ranked as one of the most popular and iconic comic book superheroes of all time and one of the most popular characters in all fiction.

Publication history

Creation and development

In 1962, with the success of the Fantastic Four, Marvel Comics editor and head writer Stan Lee was casting about for a new superhero idea. He said the idea for Spider-Man arose from a surge in teenage demand for comic books, and the desire to create a character with whom teens could identify. As with Fantastic Four, Lee saw Spider-Man as an opportunity to "get out of his system" what he felt was missing in comic books. In his autobiography, Lee cites the non-superhuman pulp magazine crime fighter the Spider as a great influence, and in a multitude of print and video interviews, Lee stated he was further inspired by seeing a spider climb up a wall—adding in his autobiography that he has told that story so often he has become unsure of whether or not this is true. Besides the name, the Spider was wanted by both the law and the criminal underworld (a defining theme of Spider-Man's early years), and had through years of ceaseless struggle developed a "sixth sense" which warns him of danger, the apparent inspiration for Spider-Man's "spider-sense". Although at the time teenage superheroes were usually given names ending with "boy", Lee says he chose "Spider-Man" because he wanted the character to age as the series progressed, and felt the name "Spider-Boy" would have made the character sound inferior to other superheroes. He also decided to insert a hyphen in the name, as he felt it looked too similar to Superman, another superhero with a red and blue costume that starts with an "S" and ends with "man" (although artist Steve Ditko intended the character to have an orange and purple costume). At that time Lee had to get only the consent of Marvel publisher Martin Goodman for the character's approval. In a 1986 interview, Lee described in detail his arguments to overcome Goodman's objections. Goodman eventually agreed to a Spider-Man tryout in what Lee in numerous interviews recalled as what would be the final issue of the science-fiction and supernatural anthology series Amazing Adult Fantasy, which was renamed Amazing Fantasy for that single issue, #15 (cover-dated August 1962, on sale June 5, 1962). In particular, Lee stated that the fact that it had already been decided that Amazing Fantasy would be canceled after issue #15 was the only reason Goodman allowed him to use Spider-Man. While this was indeed the final issue, its editorial page anticipated the comic continuing and that "The Spiderman ... will appear every month in Amazing."

Regardless, Lee received Goodman's approval for the name Spider-Man and the "ordinary teen" concept and approached artist Jack Kirby. As comics historian Greg Theakston recounts, Kirby told Lee about an unpublished character on which he had collaborated with Joe Simon in the 1950s, in which an orphaned boy living with an old couple finds a magic ring that granted him superhuman powers. Lee and Kirby "immediately sat down for a story conference", Theakston writes, and Lee afterward directed Kirby to flesh out the character and draw some pages. Steve Ditko would be the inker. When Kirby showed Lee the first six pages, Lee recalled, "I hated the way he was doing it! Not that he did it badly—it just wasn't the character I wanted; it was too heroic". Lee turned to Ditko, who developed a visual style Lee found satisfactory. Ditko recalled:

Although the interior artwork was by Ditko alone, Lee rejected Ditko's cover art and commissioned Kirby to pencil a cover that Ditko inked. As Lee explained in 2010, "I think I had Jack sketch out a cover for it because I always had a lot of confidence in Jack's covers."

In an early recollection of the character's creation, Ditko described his and Lee's contributions in a mail interview with Gary Martin published in Comic Fan #2 (Summer 1965): "Stan Lee thought the name up. I did costume, web gimmick on wrist & spider signal." At the time, Ditko shared a Manhattan studio with noted fetish artist Eric Stanton, an art-school classmate who, in a 1988 interview with Theakston, recalled that although his contribution to Spider-Man was "almost nil", he and Ditko had "worked on storyboards together and I added a few ideas. But the whole thing was created by Steve on his own... I think I added the business about the webs coming out of his hands." Ditko claimed in a rare interview with Jonathan Ross that the costume was initially envisioned with an orange and purple color scheme rather than the more famous red and blue.

Kirby disputed Lee's version of the story and claimed Lee had minimal involvement in the character's creation. According to Kirby, the idea for Spider-Man had originated with Kirby and Joe Simon, who in the 1950s had developed a character called the Silver Spider for the Crestwood Publications comic Black Magic, who was subsequently not used. Simon, in his 1990 autobiography, disputed Kirby's account, asserting that Black Magic was not a factor, and that he (Simon) devised the name "Spider-Man" (later changed to "The Silver Spider"), while Kirby outlined the character's story and powers. Simon later elaborated that his and Kirby's character conception became the basis for Simon's Archie Comics superhero the Fly. Artist Steve Ditko stated that Lee liked the name Hawkman from DC Comics, and that "Spider-Man" was an outgrowth of that interest.

Simon concurred that Kirby had shown the original Spider-Man version to Lee, who liked the idea and assigned Kirby to draw sample pages of the new character but disliked the results—in Simon's description, "Captain America with cobwebs". Writer Mark Evanier notes that Lee's reasoning that Kirby's character was too heroic seems unlikely—Kirby still drew the covers for Amazing Fantasy #15 and the first issue of The Amazing Spider-Man. Evanier also disputes Kirby's given reason that he was "too busy" to draw Spider-Man in addition to his other duties since Kirby was, said Evanier, "always busy". Neither Lee's nor Kirby's explanation explains why key story elements like the magic ring were dropped; Evanier states that the most plausible explanation for the sudden change was that Goodman, or one of his assistants, decided that Spider-Man, as drawn and envisioned by Kirby, was too similar to the Fly.

Author and Ditko scholar Blake Bell writes that it was Ditko who noted the similarities to the Fly. Ditko recalled that "Stan called Jack about the Fly", adding that "[d]ays later, Stan told me I would be penciling the story panel breakdowns from Stan's synopsis." It was at this point that the nature of the strip changed. "Out went the magic ring, adult Spider-Man and whatever legend ideas that Spider-Man story would have contained." Lee gave Ditko the premise of a teenager bitten by a spider and developing powers, a premise Ditko would expand upon to the point he became what Bell describes as "the first work for hire artist of his generation to create and control the narrative arc of his series". On the issue of the initial creation, Ditko stated, "I still don't know whose idea was Spider-Man". Ditko did, however, view the published version of Spider-Man as a separate creation to the one he saw in the five pencilled pages that Kirby had completed. To support this Ditko used the analogy of the Kirby/Marvel Thor, which was based on a name/idea of a character in Norse mythology: "If Marvel’s Thor is a valid created work by Jack, his creation, then why isn’t Spider-Man by Stan and me valid created work, our creation?" 

Kirby noted in a 1971 interview that it was Ditko who "got Spider-Man to roll, and the thing caught on because of what he did". Lee, while claiming credit for the initial idea, has acknowledged Ditko's role, stating, "If Steve wants to be called co-creator, I think he deserves [it]". He has further commented that Ditko's costume design was key to the character's success; since the costume completely covers Spider-Man's body, people of all races could visualize themselves inside the costume and thus more easily identify with the character.

Commercial success
A few months after Spider-Man's introduction, publisher Goodman reviewed the sales figures for that issue and was shocked to find it was one of the nascent Marvel's highest-selling comics. A solo ongoing series followed, beginning with The Amazing Spider-Man #1 (cover-dated March 1963). The title eventually became Marvel's top-selling series with the character swiftly becoming a cultural icon; a 1965 Esquire poll of college campuses found that college students ranked Spider-Man and fellow Marvel hero the Hulk alongside Bob Dylan and Che Guevara as their favorite revolutionary icons. One interviewee selected Spider-Man because he was "beset by woes, money problems, and the question of existence. In short, he is one of us." Following Ditko's departure after issue #38 (July 1966), John Romita Sr. replaced him as penciller and would draw the series for the next several years. In 1968, Romita would also draw the character's extra-length stories in the comics magazine The Spectacular Spider-Man, a proto-graphic novel designed to appeal to older readers. It only lasted for two issues, but it represented the first Spider-Man spin-off publication, aside from the original series' summer Annuals that began in 1964.

An early 1970s Spider-Man story ultimately led to the revision of the Comics Code. Previously, the Code forbade the depiction of the use of illegal drugs, even negatively. However, in 1970, the Nixon administration's Department of Health, Education, and Welfare asked Stan Lee to publish an anti-drug message in one of Marvel's top-selling titles. Lee chose the top-selling The Amazing Spider-Man; issues #96–98 (May–July 1971) feature a story arc depicting the negative effects of drug use. In the story, Peter Parker's friend Harry Osborn becomes addicted to pills. When Spider-Man fights the Green Goblin (Norman Osborn, Harry's father), Spider-Man defeats him by revealing Harry's drug addiction. While the story had a clear anti-drug message, the Comics Code Authority refused to issue its seal of approval. Marvel nevertheless published the three issues without the Comics Code Authority's approval or seal. The issues sold so well that the industry's self-censorship was undercut and the Code was subsequently revised.

In 1972, a second monthly ongoing series starring Spider-Man began: Marvel Team-Up, in which Spider-Man was paired with other superheroes and supervillains. From that point on, there have generally been at least two ongoing Spider-Man series at any time. In 1976, his second solo series, Peter Parker, the Spectacular Spider-Man began running parallel to the main series. A third series featuring Spider-Man, Web of Spider-Man, launched in 1985 to replace Marvel Team-Up. The launch of a fourth monthly title in 1990, the "adjectiveless" Spider-Man (with the storyline "Torment"), written and drawn by popular artist Todd McFarlane, debuted with several different covers, all with the same interior content. The various versions combined sold over 3 million copies, an industry record at the time. Several miniseries, one-shot issues, and loosely related comics have also been published, and Spider-Man makes frequent cameos and guest appearances in other comic book series. In 1996, The Sensational Spider-Man was created to replace Web of Spider-Man.

In 1998 writer-artist John Byrne revamped the origin of Spider-Man in the 13-issue limited series Spider-Man: Chapter One (Dec. 1998 – Oct. 1999), similar to Byrne's adding details and some revisions to Superman's origin in DC Comics' The Man of Steel. At the same time, the original The Amazing Spider-Man was ended with issue #441 (Nov. 1998), and The Amazing Spider-Man was restarted with vol. 2, #1 (Jan. 1999). In 2003, Marvel reintroduced the original numbering for The Amazing Spider-Man and what would have been vol. 2, #59 became issue #500 (Dec. 2003).

When the primary series The Amazing Spider-Man reached issue #545 (Dec. 2007), Marvel dropped its spin-off ongoing series and instead began publishing The Amazing Spider-Man three times monthly, beginning with #546–548 (all January 2008). The three times-monthly scheduling of The Amazing Spider-Man lasted until November 2010, when the comic book was increased from 22 pages to 30 pages each issue and published only twice a month, beginning with #648–649 (both November 2010). The following year, Marvel launched Avenging Spider-Man as the first spin-off ongoing series in addition to the still-twice monthly The Amazing Spider-Man since the previous ones were canceled at the end of 2007. The Amazing series temporarily ended with issue #700 in December 2012, and was replaced by The Superior Spider-Man, which had Doctor Octopus serve as the new Spider-Man, his mind having taken over Peter Parker's body. Superior was an enormous commercial success for Marvel, and ran for 31 issues before the real Peter Parker returned in a newly relaunched The Amazing Spider-Man #1 in April 2014.

Following the 2015 Secret Wars crossover event, a number of Spider-Man-related titles were either relaunched or created as part of the "All-New, All-Different Marvel" event. Among them, The Amazing Spider-Man was relaunched as well and primarily focuses on Peter Parker continuing to run Parker Industries, and becoming a successful businessman who is operating worldwide.

Fictional character biography

Early years
In Forest Hills, Queens, New York City, Midtown High School student, Peter Benjamin Parker, is a science-whiz orphan living with his Uncle Ben and Aunt May ever since his parents, Richard and Mary Parker died in a plane accident back when Peter was a kid, leaving his uncle and aunt to care for him, they loved Peter as their own son despite that he is their nephew including Peter and Uncle Ben formed their "father and son" moments together, he also became a well educated high school student who has won a scholarship in science class and gets higher grades but was socially inept and outcast, having been mocked and isolated by his classmates, especially his main bully and his peers—particularly football star, Flash Thompson. As depicted in Amazing Fantasy #15 (Aug. 1962), Peter Parker is bitten by a radioactive spider (erroneously classified as an insect in the panel) at the science exhibit, and it changed his life forever; Peter has discovers that he has the incredible superhuman spider-powers and abilities; which "acquires the proportionate strength of a spider", the proportionate speed of a spider, agility, jump, lightning-fast reflexes, stamina, durability, equilibrium such as possessing the power of coordination and balance, climbing walls and ceilings like a spider, and then detecting dangers and upcoming threats by using his precognition ability called "spider-sense". Along with heightened athletic powers, Peter test out his powers which he easily use it to defeat the heavyweight wrestling champion called "Crusher Hogan" before being offered by tv producer to make fortune by becoming a TV superstar. Through his native knack for science, Peter develops gadgets called "web-shooters" that lets him fire adhesive spider-webbing of his own design through small, wrist-mounted barrels and can use his web to web-swing across the cities and places. And initially seeking to gain popularity by using his newfound powers and his abilities, Peter begins to create a red and blue costume; he creates the red mask with white spider eyes, web tights on red parts except for blue parts, and a black spider symbol on his chest and red spider symbol on his back; Peter becomes "Spider-Man" before making his first appearance as a novelty television star. However, "He blithely ignores the chance to stop a fleeing thief, his indifference ironically catches up with him when the same criminal later robs and kills his Uncle Ben." Spider-Man vengefully tracks and overpowers the killer, but then he learns, in the story's next-to-last caption, "With great power, there must also come—great responsibility!" which inspires Spider-Man to use his spider-powers to fight crime by becoming the masked vigilante superhero.

In The Amazing Spider-Man; issue #1  (March 1963), despite his superpowers, Peter struggles to help his widowed Aunt May pay the rent, is taunted by Flash, and as Spider-Man, he continues fighting crime and saving the city, but his heroic deeds engender the editorial wrath of newspaper publisher of the Daily Bugle, J. Jonah Jameson, who holds grudge against Spider-Man, continues making false statements against Spider-Man despite his heroism. Peter gets hired as a freelance photographer by Mr. Jameson to take pictures of Spider-Man, but he is unaware that Spider-Man is Peter Parker. Spider-Man fights his enemies including superpowered and non-superpowered supervillains such as his arch-enemy and nemesis called the Green Goblin, and then Doctor Octopus, Sandman, Chameleon, Lizard, Vulture, Kraven the Hunter, Electro, Mysterio, and more villains and defeats them one by one, but Peter finds himself juggling his personal life and costumed adventures difficult. In time, Peter graduates from high school and enrolls at Empire State University (a fictional institution evoking the real-life Columbia University and New York University), where he meets roommate and best friend Harry Osborn and girlfriend Gwen Stacy, and Aunt May introduces him to Mary Jane Watson. As Peter deals with Harry's drug problems, and Harry's father, Norman Osborn, is revealed to be Spider-Man's nemesis the Green Goblin, Peter even attempts to give up his costumed identity for a while. Gwen Stacy's father, New York City Police detective Captain George Stacy, is accidentally killed during a battle between Spider-Man and Doctor Octopus (issue #90, November 1970).

1970s
In issue #121 (June 1973), the Green Goblin throws Gwen Stacy from a tower of either the Brooklyn Bridge (as depicted in the art) or the George Washington Bridge (as given in the text). She dies during Spider-Man's rescue attempt, Spider-Man swore revenge against his nemesis; a note on the letters page of issue #125 states: "It saddens us to say that the whiplash effect she underwent when Spidey's webbing stopped her so suddenly was, in fact, what killed her." The following issue, Spider-Man vengefully attacks and overpowers the Green Goblin who appears to have killed himself accidentally in the ensuing battle with Spider-Man.

Working through his grief, Peter eventually develops tentative feelings toward Mary Jane, and the two "become confidants rather than lovers". A romantic relationship eventually develops, with Parker proposing to her in issue #182 (July 1978), and being turned down an issue later. Parker went on to graduate from college in issue #185, and becomes involved with the shy Debra Whitman and the extroverted, flirtatious costumed thief Felicia Hardy, a.k.a. the Black Cat, whom he meets in issue #194 (July 1979).

1980s
From 1984 to 1988, Spider-Man wore a black costume with a white spider design on his chest. The new costume originated in the Secret Wars miniseries, on an alien planet where Spider-Man participates in a battle between Earth's major superheroes and supervillains. He continues wearing the costume when he returns, starting in The Amazing Spider-Man #252. The change to a longstanding character's design met with controversy, "with many hardcore comics fans decrying it as tantamount to sacrilege. Spider-Man's traditional red and blue costume was iconic, they argued, on par with those of his D.C. rivals Superman and Batman." The creators then revealed the costume was an alien symbiote which Spider-Man is able to reject after a difficult struggle, though the symbiote returns several times as Venom for revenge.
Parker proposes to Watson in The Amazing Spider-Man #290 (July 1987), and she accepts two issues later, with the wedding taking place in The Amazing Spider-Man Annual #21 (1987)—promoted with a real-life mock wedding using actors at Shea Stadium, with Stan Lee officiating, on June 5, 1987. David Michelinie, who scripted based on a plot by editor-in-chief Jim Shooter, said in 2007, "I didn't think they actually should [have gotten] married. ... I had actually planned another version, one that wasn't used." Parker published a book of Spider-Man photographs called Webs. and returned to his Empire State University graduate studies in biochemistry in #310 (Dec. 1988).

1990s
In the controversial 1990s storyline the "Clone Saga", a clone of Parker, created in 1970s comics by insane scientist Miles Warren, a.k.a. the Jackal, returns to New York City upon hearing of Aunt May's health worsening. The clone had lived incognito as "Ben Reilly", but now assumes the superhero guise the Scarlet Spider and allies with Parker. To the surprise of both, new tests indicate "Reilly" is the original and "Parker" the clone. Complicating matters, Watson announces in The Spectacular Spider-Man #220 (Jan. 1995) that she is pregnant with Parker's baby. Later, however, a resurrected Green Goblin (Norman Osborn) has Watson poisoned, causing premature labor and the death of her and Parker's unborn daughter. The Green Goblin had switched the results of the clone test in an attempt to destroy Parker's life by making him believe himself to be the clone. Reilly is killed while saving Parker, in Peter Parker: Spider-Man #75 (Dec. 1996), and his body immediately crumbles into dust, confirming Reilly was the clone.

In issue #97 (Nov. 1998) of the second series titled Peter Parker: Spider-Man, Parker learns his Aunt May was kidnapped by Norman Osborn and her apparent death in The Amazing Spider-Man #400 (April 1995) had been a hoax. Shortly afterward, in The Amazing Spider-Man (vol. 2) #13 (#454, Jan. 2000), Watson is apparently killed in an airplane explosion. She turns up alive and well in (vol. 2) #28 (#469, April 2001), but she and Peter become separated in the following issue.

2000s
Babylon 5 creator J. Michael Straczynski began writing The Amazing Spider-Man, illustrated by John Romita Jr., beginning with (vol. 2) #30 (#471, June 2001). Two issues later, Parker, now employed as a teacher at his old high school, meets the enigmatic Ezekiel, who possesses similar spider powers and suggests that Parker having gained such abilities might not have been a fluke—that Parker has a connection to a totemic spider spirit. In (vol. 2) #37 (#478, Jan. 2002), May discovers her nephew Parker is Spider-Man, leading to a new openness in their relationship. Parker and Watson reconcile in (vol. 2) #50 (#491, April 2003), and in #512 (Nov. 2004)—the original issue numbering having returned with #500—Parker learns his late girlfriend Gwen Stacy had had two children with Norman Osborn.

He joins the superhero team the New Avengers in New Avengers #1–2. After their respective homes are destroyed by a deranged, superpowered former high-school classmate, Parker, Watson, and May move into Stark Tower, and Parker begins working as Tony Stark's assistant while again freelancing for The Daily Bugle and continuing his teaching. In the 12-part 2005 story arc "The Other", Parker undergoes a transformation that evolves his powers. In the comic Civil War #2 (June 2006), part of the company-wide crossover arc of that title, the U.S. government's Superhuman Registration Act leads Spider-Man to reveal his true identity publicly. A growing unease about the Registration Act prompts him to escape with May and Watson and join the anti-registration underground.

In issue #537 (Dec. 2006), May is critically wounded by a sniper hired by Wilson Fisk and enters into a coma. Parker, desperate to save her, exhausts all possibilities and makes a pact with the demon-lord Mephisto, who saves May's life in exchange for Parker and Watson agreeing to have their marriage and all memory of it disappear. In this changed reality, Spider-Man's identity is secret once again, and in #545 (Jan. 2008), Watson returns and is cold toward him.

That controversial storyline, "One More Day", rolled back much of the fictional continuity at the behest of editor-in-chief Joe Quesada, who said, "Peter being single is an intrinsic part of the very foundation of the world of Spider-Man". It caused unusual public friction between Quesada and writer Straczynski, who "told Joe that I was going to take my name off the last two issues of the [story] arc", but was talked out of doing so. At issue with Straczynski's climax to the arc, Quesada said, was

In this new continuity, designed to have very limited repercussions throughout the remainder of the Marvel Universe, Parker returns to work at the Daily Bugle, which has been renamed The DB under a new publisher. He soon switches to the alternative press paper The Front Line. J. Jonah Jameson becomes the Mayor of New York City in issue #591 (June 2008). Jameson's estranged father, J. Jonah Jameson Sr., marries May in issue #600 (Sept. 2009).

During the "Secret Invasion" by shape-shifting extra-terrestrials, the Skrulls, Norman Osborn shoots and kills the Skrull queen Veranke. He leverages this widely publicized success, positioning himself as the new director of the S.H.I.E.L.D.-like paramilitary force H.A.M.M.E.R. to advance his agenda, while using his public image to start his own Dark Avengers. Norman himself leads the Dark Avengers as the Iron Patriot, a suit of armor fashioned by himself after Iron Man's armor with Captain America's colors.

Harry is approached by Norman with the offer of a job within the Dark Avengers. It is later revealed that it is a ruse to coerce Harry into taking the American Son armor, whom Norman had planned to kill, in order to increase public sympathy. When Harry has the option of killing Norman, Spider-Man says to decapitate him, since Norman's healing factor may repair a blow to the head. Spider-Man also cautions Harry that killing Norman will cause Harry to "become the son Norman always wanted". Harry instead backs down, and turns away from his father forever.

2010s
At Loki's suggestion, Norman Osborn creates a rationale to invade Asgard, claiming the world poses a national security threat. He is however defeated, and ends up incarcerated in the Raft penitentiary. A conflict between Spider-Man and Doctor Octopus over Osborn's son ends when it is revealed the child's father is Harry, who leaves town to raise him. One of Doctor Octopus' Octobots managed to swap his and Spider Man's personality, causing Peter to become trapped in the Doctor's dying body while he in turn claimed Peter's life for himself. Though Peter failed to reverse the change, he managed to establish a weak link with the Doctor's mind, forcing him to relive all of his memories; Otto understands Peter's ideals of power and responsibility and swears to carry on with Peter's life with dignity as a "Superior" Spider-Man.

A portion of Peter survived in his original body in the form of a subconsciousness. Later, realizing that he failed in his role as the "Superior" Spider-Man, Otto willingly allowed Peter to reclaim his body in order to defeat Osborn and save Anna Maria Marconi, Otto's love. In the aftermath of these events, Peter began to amend the relationships damaged by Otto's arrogance and negligence, both as Peter Parker and Spider-Man. He additionally took up the reins of Parker Industries, a small company founded by Otto after leaving Horizon Labs.

Peter soon learned a second person had been bitten by the radioactive spider, Cindy Moon. Spider-Man tracked her down and freed her from a bunker owned by the late Ezekiel Simms. Not long after rescuing Cindy, who went on to adopt her own superheroic identity as Silk, Spider-Man was approached by a contingent of spider-people from all over the Multiverse that banded together to fight the Inheritors, a group of psychic vampires who had begun to hunt down the spider-totems of other realities. During a mission to gather more recruits in A.D. 2099, the Spider-Army stumbled upon another party of spider-people led by a version of Otto Octavius. Together, they neutralized the Inheritors and went their separate ways.

Peter then stopped another nefarious plan, this time put forward by the Jackal. After the events of "Go Down Swinging," Peter's life was plagued with problems on both sides. As Spider-Man, Mayor Fisk publicly supported him, condemning all other vigilantes in order to isolate him from his superhero peers. As Peter Parker, his academic credentials were revoked after being accused of plagiarizing his doctoral dissertation from Octavius, resulting in his firing from the Daily Bugle. On the other hand, Peter became romantically involved again with Mary Jane. For a brief time, Peter Parker and Spider-Man were split into separate beings due to an accident involving the reverse-engineered Isotope Genome Accelerator. Peter eventually managed to reverse the process, and merge his two halves back together before the side-effects could worsen and result in their death.

2020s

Kindred uses the resurrected Sin-Eater's sins to possess Miles Morales, Spider-Gwen, Spider-Woman, Anya Corazon, and Julia Carpenter. Doctor Strange, who manages to restrain a possessed Silk, agrees to help Spider-Man. However, Peter dies when fighting Kindred. While dead, Peter's consciousness remembered the fateful day of the start of One More Day; Kindred is willing to resurrect Peter.

Personality and themes

Sally Kempton for the Village Voice opined in 1965 that "Spider-Man has a terrible identity problem, a marked inferiority complex, and a fear of women. He is anti-social, castration-ridden, racked with Oedipal guilt, and accident-prone ... [a] functioning neurotic". Agonizing over his choices, always attempting to do right, he is nonetheless viewed with suspicion by the authorities, who seem unsure as to whether he is a helpful vigilante or a clever criminal.

Notes cultural historian Bradford W. Wright,

The mid-1960s stories reflect the political tensions of the time. Early 1960s Marvel stories often deal with the Cold War and Communism. As Wright observes,

Powers, abilities, and equipment
Spider-Man has superhuman spider-powers and abilities being mutated after being bitten by a radioactive spider; Spider-Man's spider-powers include his superhuman strength; Spider-Man has the proportionate strength of a spider, which allows him to lift up 10 tons or more if he is enraged or under extreme stress. Spider-Man possesses his superhuman speed; Spider-Man has the proportionate speed of a spider, allowing him to run at speeds far greater than a normal human being and even outrun cars. It also allows him to dodge attacks, namely gunfire, with his signature spider-sense, agility, and reflexes during combat. Spider-Man can also web-swing at incredible speeds across the city. His speed also allows him to utilize his quick agility and reflexes, which also helps him in both hand-to-hand combat and web-shooting. Whilst running, he can reach speeds of up to 250 miles per hour.

Spider-Man possesses superhuman agility; he has the proportionate agility of a spider and coupled with his speed and reflexes, his acrobatic fighting style is incredibly difficult to counter. Additionally, Spider-Man possesses superhuman jump, which allows him to leap at 100 m higher and enables him to acrobatically jump from the top of one building to another.

Spider-Man's spider-sense can also combine his superhuman reflexes and as well as his speed and agility which would make him faster than ordinary humans. Spider-Man's combination of his powers such as strength, agility, stamina, reflexes, and speed allows him to dodge several attacks. Spider-Man's superhuman stamina enables him as more active without tired out or in a state of exhaustion and capable of holding his breath for minutes at a time, among other things.

Spider-Man also possesses superhuman durability, allowing him to withstand any attack or damage he receives. He is not invulnerable, as he can be injured though his healing process is accelerated.

Spider-Man gains superhuman equilibrium which he possess coordination and balance, allowing him to adjust his position by sense on any object, despite how small or narrow it is. Spider-Man's most best-known spider-power, is his precognitive sixth sense referred to as his "spider-sense," which alerts him to danger which he is described as "untouchable" in combat. Being his most important superpower whenever danger is present, Spider-Man can feel the alert or a buzz inside his skull that tells him something dangerous is coming and he could detect and react immediately before it can happen. His spider-sense can also allow him to attack and dodge without seeing effortlessly with the sensory focus which would allow him to avoid targets that are on him and even surpass the enemies' surprise attacks against him such as dodging and counter-attacking. Since the original Stan Lee-Steve Ditko stories, Spider-Man has had the ability to cling to wall surfaces and ceilings and climb them like a spider. The Official Handbook of the Marvel Universe speculated that this was based on a distance-dependent interaction between his body and surfaces, known as the van der Waals force, Though in the 2002's Spider-Man film, Spider-Man's hands and feet are lined with tiny clinging cilia claws in the manner of a real spider's feet which allows him to scale buildings instantly without any slippery situations.

Spider-Man has a accelerated healing factor that allows him to recover from injuries sustained during battle. In the aftermath of the 1989 "Acts of Vengeance" storyline, Spider-Man was said to have "superhuman recuperative abilities" that sped up his recovery from the exhaustion he suffered in defeating the Tri-Sentinel.

Peter Parker was originally conceived by Stan Lee and Steve Ditko as intellectually gifted, but later writers have depicted his intellect at genius level. Academically brilliant, Peter has expertise in the fields of applied science, chemistry, physics, biology, engineering, mathematics, and mechanics. Even Reed Richards, the most intelligent individual in the Marvel universe and a prolific scientist in his own right, has acknowledged that Peter’s knowledge of biology surpasses his own, admitting that Peter can think of a problem from a biology perspective where he would be unable to do so since his expertise lies in physics. After his years of crime-fighting despite not have been receiving or undergone any known training, Spider-Man is the most highly skilled and crime-fighting Marvel superhero, having honed his fighting skills into an equivalent martial arts skills and hand-to-hand combat skills that is unique to his spider-powers making him the most master and powerful fighter, thanks to his incredible superhuman spider-like physiology, heightened acrobatic power and ability prowess. Spider-Man easily attacks and overpowers several ordinary criminals during his crime-fighting career, able to attack his enemies with his incredible punching and kicking skills and techniques with martial art and acrobatic styles either on the ground or in mid-air. Spider-Man is a powerful and formidable hand-to-hand combatant and martial artist having used a fighting style derived from his spider-like powers and abilities with his incredible fighting skills and techniques in a mix of his super speed, super strength, super agility, super jump, super reflexes, super stamina, spider-sense, super equilibrium, and web-shooters making him far more powerful and strong crime-fighter, able to beat several enemies as they couldn't be able to attack Spider-Man not even a single touch in combat, Spider-Man's combat skills is said that he relied on his powers. Spider-Man is able to fight and hold his own in hand-to-hand combat against formidable supervillains such as Green Goblin, Doctor Octopus, Sandman, Chameleon, Vulture, Mysterio, Electro, Lizard, Scorpion, Shocker, Kingpin, Kraven the Hunter, Venom, and other Marvel superheroes. Using a combination of his superhuman strength, speed, agility, jumping, equilibrium, leaping, reflexes, stamina, spider-sense, intelligence, and web shooters, Spider-Man utilizes his fighting movement with a mix of his superhuman spider-powers in a style of acrobatic martial art skills including punching and kicking which makes him more dangerous fighter and opponent, able to defeat criminals, supervillains, and other skilled Marvel superhero fighters. His fighting style is unique and specific to him, as such, it is incredibly difficult for human beings to combat against; Spider-Man has been fighting crime throughout his career, making him the most powerful and self-taught combatant.

With his talents, Peter created his own red and blue Spider-Man costume to conceal his secret identity, he creates many devices that perfected his powers; Spider-Man's main trademark and best and most well-known mechanical equipment is his "web-shooters", that allows him to shoot webs, web-swing at high speeds throughout the city, to help navigate, attack and trap his enemies with his webs during crime-fighting that including web-attacks, web-strikes, web-balls, and web-bullets. Spider-Man's web shooters are high-speeding devices that allow him to shoot spider-webs with his multiples of his artificial web fluid with air and super strong thread out of his wrist-mounted devices web at high speeds and pressure which is strong and tougher web that neither normal criminals can break free. Spider-Man's web is far stronger than any iron or steel, especially for supervillains with superhuman strength. The web-shooters can shoot webs at 100 m away straight line and as well as higher density, and could also allow Spider-Man to web-swing across the cities and places which is Spider-Man's most unique skill of all, and this also allows Spider-Man, while web-swinging, to launch a powerful kick at his enemies that could send them miles away. However, Spider-Man's spider-webs can last at least either 1 or 3 hours before the web melts down. Spider-Man's other equipment is the spider-signal as a flashlight and as a warning beacon to every criminals as Spider-Man. Thomas Fireheart's scientists, among the best in the world, are unable to replicate the fluid Peter created while in high school.

Supporting cast

Spider-Man has had a large range of supporting characters introduced in the comics that are essential in the issues and storylines that star him. After his parents died, Peter Parker was raised by his loving aunt, May Parker, and his uncle and father figure, Ben Parker. After Uncle Ben is murdered by a burglar, Aunt May is virtually Peter's only family, and she and Peter are very close.

J. Jonah Jameson is the publisher of the Daily Bugle and Peter Parker's boss. A harsh critic of Spider-Man, he constantly features negative articles about the superhero in his newspaper. Despite his role as Jameson's editor and confidant, Robbie Robertson is always depicted as a supporter of both Spider-Man and his alter ego Peter Parker.

Eugene "Flash" Thompson is commonly depicted as Peter Parker's high school tormentor and bully, who idolizes Spider-Man, but is unaware that Spider-Man is Peter Parker. Later comic issues he becomes a friend to Peter and adopts his own superhero identity, Agent Venom, after merging with the Venom symbiote. Meanwhile, Harry Osborn, son of Norman Osborn, is most commonly recognized as Peter's best friend, although some versions depicted him as his rival.

Enemies 

Writers and artists over the years have established a rogues gallery of supervillains to face Spider-Man, in comics and in other media. As with the hero, the majority of the villains' powers originate with scientific accidents or the misuse of scientific technology, and many have animal-themed costumes or powers. The most notable Spider-Man villains are listed down below in the ordering of their original chronological appearance:

  Indicates a group. 

Unlike most superheroes, Spider-Man does not have a single villain with whom he has come into conflict the most. Instead, he is often regarded as having three archenemies, and it can be debated as to which one is the worst:

 Doctor Octopus (a.k.a. Doc Ock) is a highly intelligent mad scientist who utilizes four mechanical appendages for both movement and combat. He has been described as Spider-Man's greatest enemy, and the man Peter Parker might have become if he had not been raised with a sense of responsibility. Doc Ock is infamous for defeating him the first time in battle and for almost marrying Peter's Aunt May. He is also the core leader of the Sinister Six, and at one point adopted the "Master Planner" alias. ("If This Be My Destiny...!") Later depictions revealed him in Peter Parker's body where he was the titular character for a while.
 The Norman Osborn version of the Green Goblin is most commonly regarded as Spider-Man's arch-enemy. While Norman is usually portrayed as an amoral industrialist and the head of the Oscorp scientific corporation, the Goblin is a psychopathic alternate personality, born after Norman's exposore to some unstable chemicals that also increased his strength and agility. The Goblin is a Halloween-themed villain, dressing up like an actual goblin and utilizing a large arsenal of high tech weapons, including a glider and pumpkin-shaped explosives. Unlike most villains, who only aim to kill Spider-Man, the Goblin also targeted his loved ones and showed no remorse in killing them as long as it caused pain to Spider-Man, therefore making him not only Spider-Man's worst enemy, but also Peter Parker's. His most infamous feat is killing Spider-Man's girlfriend in what became one of the most famous Spider-Man stories of all time and helped end the Silver Age of Comic Books and begin the Bronze Age of Comic Books. While the Goblin was killed in the same story, he returned in the 1990s to plague Spider-Man once again, committing more heinous acts (such as being involved in the murder of Aunt May). He also came into conflict with other heroes, such as the Avengers. Norman is sometimes depicted as an enemy of Spider-Man even when not being the Green Goblin.
 The Eddie Brock incarnation of Venom is often regarded as Spider-Man's deadliest foe, and has been described as an evil mirror version of Spider-Man in many ways. He is also among Spider-Man's most popular villains. Originally a reporter who grew to despise Spider-Man, Eddie later came into contact with the Venom symbiote, which had been rejected by Spider-Man. The symbiote merged with Eddie and gave him the same powers as Spider-Man, in addition to making him immune to the web-slinger's "spider-sense". Venom's main goal is usually to ruin Peter Parker's life and mess with his head in any way he can. Despite this, Venom is not a traditional criminal, as he is only interested in hurting Spider-Man and does not engage in criminal acts, lacking the typical supervillain desires for wealth and power. The character also has a sense of honor and justice, and later starred in his own comic book stories, where he is depicted as an antihero and has a desire to protect innocent people from harm. On several occasions, he and Spider-Man even put their differences aside and became allies.

Romantic interests 
Peter Parker's romantic interests range between his first crush, fellow high-school student Liz Allan, to having his first date with Betty Brant, secretary to the Daily Bugle newspaper publisher J. Jonah Jameson. After his breakup with Betty Brant, Parker eventually falls in love with his college girlfriend Gwen Stacy, daughter of New York City Police Department detective Captain George Stacy, both of whom are later killed by supervillain enemies of Spider-Man. Mary Jane Watson eventually became Peter's best friend and then his wife. Felicia Hardy, the Black Cat, is a reformed cat burglar who had been Spider-Man's sole superhuman girlfriend and partner at one point.

Alternate versions of Spider-Man 

Within the Marvel Universe there exists a multiverse with many variations of Spider-Men. An early character included in the 1980s is the fictional anthropomorphic animal parody of Spider-Man in pig form named Spider-Ham (Peter Porker). Many imprints of Spider-Men were created, like the futuristic version of Spider-Man in Marvel 2099 named Miguel O'Hara. In the MC2 imprint, Peter marries Mary Jane and has a daughter named Mayday Parker, who carries on Spider-Man's legacy and Marvel Noir has a 1930s version of Peter Parker. Other themed versions exist within the early 2000s, such as a Marvel Mangaverse version and an Indian version from Spider-Man: India named Pavitr Prabhakar.

Ultimate Spider-Man was a popular modern retelling of Spider-Man; Peter Parker. The version of Peter Parker would later be depicted as being apparently killed off and replaced by an Afro-Latino Spider-Man named Miles Morales.

The storyline "Spider-Verse" brought back many alternates takes on Spider-Man and introduced many newly inspired ones, such as an alternate world where Gwen Stacy gets bitten by a radioactive spider instead, along with a British-themed version named Spider-UK called Billy Braddock from the Captain Britain Corps.

Cultural impact and legacy

In The Creation of Spider-Man, comic book writer-editor and historian Paul Kupperberg calls the character's superpowers "nothing too original"; what was original was that outside his secret identity, he was a "nerdy high school student". Going against typical superhero fare, Spider-Man included "heavy doses of soap-opera and elements of melodrama". Kupperberg feels that Lee and Ditko had created something new in the world of comics: "the flawed superhero with everyday problems". This idea spawned a "comics revolution". The insecurity and anxieties in Marvel's early 1960s comic books, such as The Amazing Spider-Man, The Incredible Hulk, The Fantastic Four, and The X-Men ushered in a new type of superhero, very different from the certain and all-powerful superheroes before them, and changed the public's perception of them. After the comics depicted a real address in Forest Hills, Queens, New York as May Parker's residence, its residents received many letters from children to the superhero.

Spider-Man has become one of the most recognizable fictional characters in the world, and has been used to sell toys, games, cereal, candy, soap, and many other products. He has often been used as the company mascot. When Marvel became the first comic book company to be listed on the New York Stock Exchange in 1991, The Wall Street Journal announced "Spider-Man is coming to Wall Street"; the event was in turn promoted with an actor in a Spider-Man costume accompanying Stan Lee to the Stock Exchange. Since 1962, hundreds of millions of comics featuring the character have been sold around the world. Spider-Man is the world's most profitable superhero. In 2014, global retail sales of licensed products related to Spider-Man reached approximately $1.3 billion. Comparatively, this amount exceeds the global licensing revenue of Batman, Superman, and the Avengers combined.
Spider-Man is also one of the highest-grossing franchise titles being the highest-grossing American comic book superhero  worldwide.

Spider-Man joined the Macy's Thanksgiving Day Parade from 1987 to 1998 as one of the balloon floats, designed by John Romita Sr., one of the character's signature artists. A new, different Spider-Man balloon float also appeared from 2009 to 2014.

When Marvel wanted to issue a story dealing with the immediate aftermath of the September 11 attacks, the company chose the December 2001 issue of The Amazing Spider-Man.
In 2006, Spider-Man garnered major media coverage with the revelation of the character's secret identity, an event detailed in a full-page story in the New York Post before the issue containing the story was even released.

In 2008, Marvel announced plans to release a series of educational comics the following year in partnership with the United Nations, depicting Spider-Man alongside the UN Peacekeeping Forces to highlight UN peacekeeping missions. A BusinessWeek article listed Spider-Man as one of the top 10 most intelligent fictional characters in American comics.

In 2015, the Supreme Court of the United States decided Kimble v. Marvel Entertainment, LLC, a case concerning royalties on a patent for an imitation web shooter. The opinion for the Court, by Justice Elena Kagan, included several Spider-Man references, concluding with the statement that "with great power, there must also come—great responsibility".

Spider-Man has become a subject of scientific inquiry. In 1987, researchers at Loyola University conducted a study into the utility of Spider-Man comics for informing children and parents about issues relating to child abuse.

Reception

In 2005, Bravo's Ultimate Super Heroes, Vixens, and Villains TV series declared that Spider-Man was the number 1 superhero. Empire magazine ranked him the fifth-greatest comic book character of all time. Wizard magazine placed Spider-Man as the third-greatest comic book character on their website. In 2011, Spider-Man placed third on IGN's Top 100 Comic Book Heroes of All Time, behind DC Comics characters Superman and Batman. and sixth in their 2012 list of "The Top 50 Avengers". In 2014, IGN identified Spider-Man the greatest Marvel Comics character of all time. A 2015 poll at Comic Book Resources named Spider-Man the greatest Marvel character of all time. IGN described him as the common everyman that represents many normal people but also noted his uniqueness compared to many top-tiered superheroes with his many depicted flaws as a superhero. IGN noted that, despite being one of the most tragic superheroes of all time, he is "one of the most fun and snarky superheroes in existence." Empire praised Spider-man's always-present sense of humor and wisecracks in the face of the many tragedies he faces. The magazine website appraised the depiction of his "iconic" superhero poses describing it as "a top artist's dream".

George Marston of Newsarama called Spider-Man's origin the greatest origin story of all time, opining that "Spider-Man's origin combines all of the most classic aspects of pathos, tragedy and scientific wonder into the perfect blend for a superhero origin."

Real-life comparisons
Real-life people who have been compared to Spider-Man for their climbing feats include:

In 1981, skyscraper-safety activist Dan Goodwin, wearing a Spider-Man suit, scaled the Sears Tower in Chicago, Illinois, the Renaissance Tower in Dallas, Texas, and the John Hancock Center in Chicago.
Alain Robert, nicknamed "Spider-Man", is a rock and urban climber who has scaled more than 70 tall buildings using his hands and feet, without using additional devices. He sometimes wears a Spider-Man suit during his climbs. In May 2003, he was paid approximately $18,000 to climb the  Lloyd's building to promote the premiere of the movie Spider-Man on the British television channel Sky Movies.
"The Human Spider", alias Bill Strother, scaled the Lamar Building in Augusta, Georgia in 1921.
 In Argentina, criminals that climb buildings and trespass into private property through the open balconies are said to use the "Spider-Man method" (in Spanish, "el Hombre Araña").

In other media

Spider-Man has appeared in comics, cartoons, films, video games, coloring books, novels, records, children's books, and theme park rides. On television, he first starred in the ABC animated series Spider-Man (1967–1970), Spidey Super Stories (1974–1977) on PBS, and the CBS live-action series The Amazing Spider-Man (1978–1979), starring Nicholas Hammond. Other animated series featuring the superhero include the syndicated Spider-Man (1981–1982), Spider-Man and His Amazing Friends (1981–1983), Fox Kids' Spider-Man (1994–1998), Spider-Man Unlimited (1999–2000), Spider-Man: The New Animated Series (2003), The Spectacular Spider-Man (2008–2009), Ultimate Spider-Man (2012–2017) Disney XD's Spider-Man (2017–2020), and Spidey and His Amazing Friends (2021–present).

A tokusatsu series featuring Spider-Man was produced by Toei and aired in Japan. It is commonly referred to by its Japanese pronunciation "Supaidā-Man". Spider-Man also appeared in other print forms besides the comics, including novels, children's books, and the daily newspaper comic strip The Amazing Spider-Man, which debuted in January 1977, with the earliest installments written by Stan Lee and drawn by John Romita Sr. Spider-Man has been adapted to other media including games, toys, collectibles, and miscellaneous memorabilia, and has appeared as the main character in numerous computer and video games on over 15 gaming platforms.

Spider-Man was featured in a trilogy of live-action films directed by Sam Raimi and starring Tobey Maguire as the titular superhero. The first Spider-Man film of the trilogy was released on May 3, 2002, followed by Spider-Man 2 (2004) and Spider-Man 3 (2007). A third sequel was originally scheduled to be released in 2011; however, Sony later decided to reboot the franchise with a new director and cast. The reboot, titled The Amazing Spider-Man, was released on July 3, 2012, directed by Marc Webb and starring Andrew Garfield as the new Spider-Man. It was followed by The Amazing Spider-Man 2 (2014). In 2015, Sony and Disney made a deal for Spider-Man to appear in the Marvel Cinematic Universe. Tom Holland made his debut as Spider-Man in the MCU film Captain America: Civil War (2016), before later starring in his standalone film Spider-Man: Homecoming (2017), directed by Jon Watts. Holland reprised his role as Spider-Man in Avengers: Infinity War (2018), Avengers: Endgame (2019), Spider-Man: Far From Home (2019), and Spider-Man: No Way Home (2021); Maguire and Garfield reprise their roles in the latter film. Jake Johnson voiced an alternate universe version of Spider-Man in the animated film Spider-Man: Into the Spider-Verse, and will reprise the role in its sequel in Spider-Man: Across the Spider-Verse (2023). Chris Pine also voiced another version of Peter Parker in Into the Spider-Verse.

Following a brief contract dispute over financial terms, in 2019 Sony and Disney reached a deal to allow Spider-Man to return to the MCU, with the two studios jointly producing Spider-Man films.

A Broadway musical, Spider-Man: Turn Off the Dark, began previews on November 14, 2010, at the Foxwoods Theatre on Broadway, with the official opening night on June 14, 2011. The music and lyrics were written by Bono and The Edge of the rock group U2, with a book by Julie Taymor, Glen Berger, Roberto Aguirre-Sacasa. Turn Off the Dark is currently the most expensive musical in Broadway history, costing an estimated $70 million. In addition, the show's unusually high running costs are reported to have been about $1.2 million per week.

In the fine arts, and starting with the Pop Art period and on a continuing basis since the 1960s, the character of Spider-Man has been "appropriated" by multiple visual artists and incorporated into contemporary artwork, most notably by Andy Warhol, Roy Lichtenstein, Mel Ramos, Dulce Pinzon, Mr. Brainwash, F. Lennox Campello, Vijay, and others.

See also
 List of Spider-Man storylines
 List of Marvel Comics superhero debuts
 With great power comes great responsibility
 The Leopard from Lime Street

Notes

References
  Content in this article was copied from Spider-Man at the Fictional Characters wiki, which is licensed under the Creative Commons Attribution-Share Alike 3.0 (Unported) (CC-BY-SA 3.0) license.

External links

 Spider-Man at Marvel Universe Wiki
 
 
 The science of Spider-Man, Cosmos
 

1962 comics debuts
Avengers (comics) characters
Characters created by Stan Lee
Characters created by Steve Ditko
Comics adapted into animated series
Comics adapted into plays
Comics adapted into radio series
Comics adapted into television series
Comics by Stan Lee
Comics by Steve Ditko
Comics characters introduced in 1962
Comics set in New York City
Experimental medical treatments in fiction
Fictional business executives
Fictional characters from Queens, New York
Fictional characters who have made pacts with devils
Fictional characters with precognition
Fictional characters with superhuman durability or invulnerability
Fictional characters with superhuman senses
Fictional college students
Fictional defectors
Fictional high school students
Fictional inventors
Fictional photographers
Fictional reporters
Fictional schoolteachers
Fictional university and college personnel
Marvel Comics American superheroes
Marvel Comics adapted into films
Marvel Comics adapted into video games
Marvel Comics characters who can move at superhuman speeds
Marvel Comics characters with accelerated healing
Marvel Comics characters with superhuman strength
Marvel Comics child superheroes

Marvel Comics film characters
Marvel Comics male superheroes
Marvel Comics martial artists
Marvel Comics mutates
Marvel Comics scientists
Marvel Comics television characters
Marvel Comics orphans
Spider-Man characters
 
Spiders in popular culture
Superheroes who are adopted
Superheroes with alter egos
Teenage characters in comics
Teenage characters in film
Teenage superheroes
Venom (character)
Vigilante characters in comics